CPR is the first studio album recorded by Crosby, Pevar and Raymond (CPR). CPR's self-titled debut album came four years after David Crosby received a life-saving liver transplant.  Featuring Jeff Pevar, renowned session guitarist and Crosby's son James Raymond, the trio crafted smart, heady, jazz-influenced rock that showcased their stunning harmonies. In 2001, they released Just Like Gravity.

Track listing
"Morrison" (lyrics: David Crosby; music: James Raymond)  – 4:45
"That House" (lyrics: Crosby; music: CPR)  – 5:25
"One for Every Moment" (Raymond) – 3:59
"At the Edge" (lyrics: Crosby; music: CPR)  – 4:21
"Somebody Else's Town" (lyrics: Crosby & Jeff Pevar; music: Raymond)  – 5:15
"Rusty and Blue" (Crosby)  – 7:35
"Somehow She Knew" (lyrics: Crosby; music: Crosby & Craig Doerge)  – 7:05
"Little Blind Fish" (lyrics: Crosby; music: Pevar)  – 3:37
"Yesterday's Child" (lyrics: Crosby & Raymond; music: Raymond)  – 4:00
"It's All Coming Back to Me Now" (lyrics: Crosby & Pevar; music: Pevar)  – 3:50
"Time Is the Final Currency" (Crosby)  – 5:18

Personnel

David Crosby - lead vocals (1, 2, 4, 6-8, 10, 11), vocals (3, 5, 9), acoustic guitar (2, 6, 7, 11), acoustic 12-string guitar (5)
Jeff Pevar - vocals, electric guitar (1, 4-6, 9-11), acoustic guitar (2, 4, 8, 9), electric slide guitar (2), nylon string guitar (3), fretless bass (4), ebow (5), mandolin (7)
James Raymond - lead vocals (3, 5, 9), vocals (1, 2, 4, 6-8, 10, 11), piano (1-3, 4, 5, 7, 9), wedding ring (3), electric piano (5, 10, 11), acoustic piano (6), drum programming (5), organ (8, 10)
Leland Sklar - bass (1, 3, 5)
James "Hutch" Hutchinson - bass (2, 7, 9, 10), fretless bass (6, 8, 11)
Russ Kunkel - drums (2)
Steve DiStanislao - drums (1, 4)
Luis Conte - percussion (1-6)
Steve Tavaglione - soprano saxophone (3)
Curt Bisquera - drums (5)
Debra Dobkin - percussion (8)
Michael Bland - drums (9, 10)

Production 
 CPR and Dan Garcia - producers
 Jan Crosby - executive producer
 Dan Garcia - engineer
 Sebastian Haimerl and Bobby Salcedo - assistant engineers
 John Gonzales - guitar technician
 Edd Kolakowski - piano technician
 R. Mac Holbert - cover design
 Floyd Crosby - cover photography

References

1998 albums
CPR (band) albums